The Orchard is an American music and entertainment company, specializing in media distribution. It is a subsidiary of Sony Music, based in New York City. In 2019, the company sold off its film and television division, which was renamed 1091 Media.

History

Founding 
The company was founded in 1997 by Scott Cohen and Richard Gottehrer in New York City.

Dimensional Associates Acquisition 
In early 2003, The Orchard was bought by Dimensional Associates. Danny Stein, the CEO of Dimensional Associates, was appointed Executive Chairman, and Greg Scholl left management consulting firm McKinsey & Company to become The Orchard's CEO, changing its strategy and operating model and building a new management team.

In 2009, The Orchard was named the 66th-fastest growing company in North America for the five-year period from 2004 to 2009.

In 2009, Scholl accepted a position as president, Local Integrated Media at NBCUniversal and Brad Navin was appointed CEO.

In 2012, Sony acquired a majority stake of 51% in the company in a cash and equity deal with an estimated total valuation of $100 million.

In 2015, the remaining equity in the company was acquired by Sony Music Entertainment for over $200 million.

IODA 

IODA (Independent Online Distribution Alliance) was a global sales, marketing and distribution company with majority stake owned by Sony. The subsidiary serviced independent artists, labels, filmmakers and other content providers on digital and mobile outlets, including making copyright claims on online content. Founded in 2003, IODA provided various distribution, marketing, publishing and administrative services to selected independent record labels, physical distributors, video companies, recording artists, filmmakers, print media publishers and independent authors, including license negotiations, media encoding and metadata management, royalty payment administration and reporting, and marketing and promotional support. IODA had relationships with major mobile and online download retailers including iTunes, eMusic, Rhapsody and Amazon.com.

On July 1, 2009, Sony Music Entertainment and IODA announced their global strategic partnership to leverage combined worldwide online retail distribution networks and complementary technologies to support independent labels and music rightsholders.

On March 5, 2012, Sony acquired the remaining stake of IODA. The company's operations were merged with the Orchard.

YouTube programming 
The Orchard's YouTube multi-channel network has more than 1,000 channels across the globe and uses technology, built in-house, called B.A.C.O.N. (Bulk Automated Claiming on The Orchard Network) to crawl, claim and track YouTube videos to monetize for their clients. It was ranked 7th in the U.S. in July 2014.

YouTube users have expressed concerns about The Orchard claiming copyright ownership of music used in user-generated content that may or may not belong to them. According to an article by The Orchard on their Daily Rind blog, if audio is matched to a particular copyright owner via YouTube's content identification system, then one or more links will be placed under the video in order to help promote the copyright owner's music, with the video remaining available. The article states that erroneous claims are removed by The Orchard Team after review upon email communication with their dispute department. However, they are not timely in their response, which leads some YouTube users (or copyright/original content owners/creators) to believe The Orchard is attempting to acquire AdSense revenue falsely from claims that go undisputed.

The Orchard along with Rumblefish Inc. was subject to a 2019 copyfraud dispute regarding a public domain performance by the United States Navy Band uploaded onto YouTube. A 2019 case study noted examples of The Orchard selling music works and digital ad revenue online without permission of the artists in the 2010 case Bryant v. Media Right Productions, Inc.

Distributed labels 
The Orchard owns the catalogues of TVT Records, Premium Latin Music (home to Aventura), Blind Pig Records,

Film distribution 
In 2019, the Orchard Film was sold and renamed 1091 Media.

BalconyTV 

BalconyTV is an online music channel launched in June 2006, featuring acoustic performances on balconies around the world. In 2007, it won Best Music Website at the Irish Digital Media Awards, and was nominated for Best Viral Video Content at the Webby Awards in 2008. Since then, the channel has expanded to hosting over 12,000 shows in over 50 cities, and more than 25 countries.

The channel was acquired by The Orchard in 2014.

References

External links
 

1997 establishments in New York City
American companies established in 1997
American record labels
Digital audio distributors
Record label distributors
Record labels established in 1997
Sony Music
Entertainment companies based in New York City
2003 mergers and acquisitions
2012 mergers and acquisitions